Teodoro Enrique Pino Miranda (1 December 1946 – 2 July 2020) was a Mexican Roman Catholic bishop.

Pino Miranda was born in Cucurpe, Mexico and was ordained to the priesthood for the Archdiocese of Hermosillo in 1972. He served as bishop of the Roman Catholic Diocese of Huajuapan de León, Mexico, from 2001 until his death in 2020.

Notes

1946 births
2020 deaths
21st-century Roman Catholic bishops in Mexico
People from Cucurpe Municipality